Germany is an unincorporated community in Houston County, Texas. It is located 10 miles northeast of Crockett on Texas State Highway 21.

The first settler was Jacob Masters, who brought his family and slaves there.  Later, he and his son attempted to get land through the Mexican colonization laws.  They each received a league of land (approximately 3 miles). John Burt was the first person in Germany to obtain a deed of land for 160 acres. The original school, built in 1883, became a black school after a new building was erected for white students. By the 1950s, Germany School was closed and consolidated with Crockett.  There has been no post office or rated business in the community. In 2000, the population was 43. The town is most notable for its name, which is shared with the country of Germany.

References

Unincorporated communities in Houston County, Texas
Unincorporated communities in Texas